Sydney Turner Cozens (17 July 1908 – 5 February 1985) was a British cyclist. He competed in the sprint event at the 1928 Summer Olympics.

Sydney was the British champion in track cycling at the inaugural British National Individual Sprint Championships in 1930.

References

External links
 

1908 births
1985 deaths
British male cyclists
Olympic cyclists of Great Britain
Cyclists at the 1928 Summer Olympics
Sportspeople from Manchester